The Ohaba is a left tributary of the river Secaș in Romania. It discharges into the Secaș in Secășel.

References

Rivers of Romania
Rivers of Alba County